The economy of Azerbaijan has gone through different stages of rapid growth, stability, and crisis. In general, economy of Azerbaijan, besides field-wise classification, can be divided into three categories: 1. recession period, covering 1992–1995, right after Azerbaijan restored its independence after the USSR collapsed, 2. recovery, from 1996 to 1997, mainly because of increased oil sales, potential oil contracts, partners, and pipelines, 3. boom, from 1998 till 2008, and finally, an economic fall, starting from 2009.

General 
After Azerbaijan became independent following the collapse of the Soviet Union, the country started to pursue its sovereign economic policy. For a newly independent country with the economy mainly based on oil and gas industry, it was quite demanding to keep its say in the world of economy giants. The key objectives of the new and independent economic policy were establishment of the economic system built on the principles of several types of property, including private property, unlike the Soviet times, integration into the global economy and transition to market economy.

Following the independence, the diverse economy of Azerbaijan started to collapse. During the first five years of independence, GDP per capita was only a little more than one third of what it was in 1989. With the poverty rate hitting 49% as of 2001 Azerbaijan started to engage in making progress in economic situation, and by 2013, GNI per capita rose up to $7.350 with $7.912 GDP per capita and only 5% unemployment rate.

The following years from 2003 till 2009 are characterized to be the boom years due to the oil exports at high prices. Since the economy of Azerbaijan, is oil-based one, meaning the main revenues are from oil exports, the fall in petroleum prices since 2010 has made a huge impact on overall economy. This, however, has positive sides to it as well. The fall in GDP and overall economy itself, has made the government realize the urgency of the diversification of the industry. If, for example, the revenues from oil exports accounted for 42% of value added GDP, and 90.7% of total gross exports, in 2015, this number was only 34.3%.

As a result of reforms mainly involving institutional changes implemented recent years, business environment in Azerbaijan improved and the country ranked 25th among 190 countries in the Doing Business report 2019 of World Bank.

Oil industry

History 
The history of the oil industry in Azerbaijan dates back to 1847, when the first oil well was drilled using a primitive percussion drilling mechanism, eleven years prior to the first oil well rilled in the US, Pennsylvania. Baku became a hub for world-scale industrial investment towards the end of the 19th century.

During the Soviet period, Baku oil was the main source for WWII and for other industries, providing 75% of the whole consumption. Oil tankers were filled and transported to their destinations through the Caspian Sea, which no doubt, had a vital role in WWII. However, wide-scale exploitation of the oil reserves for industrial reasons came only in the late 20th century.

Following the collapse of the Soviet Union, the oil production dropped dramatically mainly because of the conflict over Nagorno Karabakh with Armenia, out-of-date equipment and machinery. As a result of the successful oil and gas strategy implemented by the government, the fall of the oil industry was followed by a number of fruitful oil contracts. With the "Contract of the Century” signed in 1994, and the deal on Shah Deniz gas field in 1996 initiated an exceptional amount of international investment flowing into the oil-gas sector. $60 billion foreign investment flew into the oil and gas sector of Azerbaijan from 1994 to 2010. While the oil and gas revenues were anticipated to reach $200 billion by 2024, with the current economic crisis, oil prices, and the devaluation of manat (currency of Azerbaijan), the expectations seem to be difficult to implement.

Oil strategy plan 
As mentioned above, during the first years of independence when the new oil reservoirs were uncovered, foreign companies were interested in signing contracts to their benefit. In fact, almost all of them were not in favor of Azerbaijani people. In 1993, with the return of Heydar Aliyev to power, the talks that were going on since 1980s resumed and finally after long talks and negotiations Azerbaijan agreed to the terms of oil exploitation that actually reflected the nation's interests.

The biggest oil contract signed in Gulustan palace in Baku with the Western companies on September 20, 1994, was a turning point in the history of oil industry of Azerbaijan. One of the key objectives of the oil strategy was to establish petro-chemical and oil refineries, the building block of the national economy which were founded not long after the “Contract of the Century”.

Economic reforms

Price liberalization 
First economic reforms started in the early stage of independence, namely 1991–1993 with the liberalization of price policy and foreign economic activities. About 70–80% of consumer and producer prices were already deregulated by January, 1992 following further price liberalization rounds in April, September, and December in the same year.

The price liberalization resulted in sudden inflation in living expenses, important consumer goods and commodities. Official records show that average living expenses surpassed average income by approximately 50%.

 The price of consumer goods increased in 1991 by 2.07 times against figures of 1990, and was growing in several times every year (10.12% times in 1992, 12.3 times in 1993, 17.63 times in 1994).
 By the end of 1993, it was reported that the minimum weekly wage would not even buy one loaf of bread and that hundreds of thousands of refugees in Azerbaijan "simply face starvation," a situation that heightened social and political instability.

Privatization 
Second most important step was the privatization law that was passed in January 1993 to support the exuberant small-scale private economy which was in a desperate need of legitimizing its business ventures and operations. The policy was designed to encourage privatization of small bulk-sale business establishments, as well as large-scale and medium companies by auctions and joint stock procedures. Retail businesses were planned to be fully privatized by the end of 199, although the process prolonged. Privatization of housing was planned to be implemented by transferring the property ownership to the current residences.

Budget 
After the collapse of the Soviet Union, Azerbaijan, as all the other post-Soviet countries, started to experience the burden of losing government subsidies. So in an effort to aid the budget the government introduced excise taxes and value-added tax (VAT) as alternatives to sales and turnover taxes in early 1992.

The main sources of the budget deficit were from pay rises (increases in wages) and from military and social expenses related to the conflict in Nagorno Karabakh, mainly its defense and increasing refugee expenses. Large increases in defense and wartime expenditures (from 1.3 percent of GDP in 1991 to 7.6 percent in 1992) considerably reduced expenditures for government subsidies for consumer goods, especially in bread and fuels, as well as government investment and supplementary funding for organizations. Increasing wages of civil servants was one of the reasons of the budget deficit in 1992.

Azerbaijan introduced manat - its own currency in mid-1992. In 1994 the currency was classified as a “soft currency” and therefore non-convertible at that time.

Banking 
During the Soviet period and the period following its collapse, Azerbaijani banks were still dependent on Russian banks in terms of funding. Bank funds were spread in accordance with a single state plan, and government banks had little contribution when it came to the raising or allocation of funds. National Bank of Azerbaijan (NBA) was established in early 1992, with former Soviet banks, namely State Bank, the former USSR Industrial-Construction Bank, Azerbaijani bank of Agro-Industrial Bank of the USSR – being incorporated into the NBA. The name was then changed into Central Bank of the Republic of Azerbaijan with the referendum act on March 18, 2009.

NBA became one of the top level authorities in the new banking system and among the commercial banks (both state- and privately owned) with the Law on Banks and Banking Activity and the Law on the National Bank adopted in 1992. The Central Bank of Azerbaijan is the mere authority regulating the private and state-owned banks and funds at present.

See also 
 Ministry of Economic Development (Azerbaijan)
 Housing in Azerbaijan

References 

Economy of Azerbaijan
Reform in Azerbaijan